The 2023 season is Hougang United's 26th consecutive season in the Singapore Premier League. After finishing third in the 2021 Singapore Premier League, Hougang qualified for the 2023–24 AFC Cup.

The women team played in the Women Premier league.

Squad

Singapore Premier League

U21 Squad

Women's Squad

Coaching staff

Transfers

In

Pre-season

Mid-season

Note 1:

Loan Return 
Pre-season

Note 1: 

Mid-season

Out
Pre-season

Mid-season

Note 1:

Loan out
Pre-season

Note 1: Harhys Stewart returns on loan to GYL for another season.

Retained / Extension

Rumored 

Pre-season

Friendlies

Pre-Season Friendly

First Team

U21

Team statistics

Appearances and goals

Competitions

Overview

Charity Shield

Singapore Premier League

AFC Cup

Group stage

Singapore Cup

Group

Competition (Women's Premier League)

Women's Premier League

League table

Competition (U21)

Stage 1
All 8 teams will be each other in a round robin format before breaking into 2 groups for another 3 matches. A total of 10 matches will be played thru the season.

 League table

Stage 2

 League table

Competition (U17)

U17 League

League table

See also 
 2014 Hougang United FC season
 2015 Hougang United FC season
 2016 Hougang United FC season
 2017 Hougang United FC season
 2018 Hougang United FC season
 2019 Hougang United FC season
 2020 Hougang United FC season
 2021 Hougang United FC season
 2022 Hougang United FC season
 2023 Hougang United Women season

Notes

References 

Hougang United FC
Hougang United FC seasons
2023
1